Larak in Iran, may refer to:
 Larak, Chaharmahal and Bakhtiari
 Larak, Chalus, Mazandaran Province
 Larak Island, in Hormozgan Province
 Larak Rural District, in Hormozgan Province